Teresa of Jesus of Los Andes (13 July 1900 – 12 April 1920), born as Juana Enriqueta Josephina de Los Sagrados Corazones Fernández Solar, was a Chilean professed religious from the Discalced Carmelites. Fernández Solar was a pious child but had an often unpredictable temperament for she could be prone to anger and being vain but could also demonstrate her charitable and loving nature; she seemed transformed when she decided to become a nun and her character seemed to change for her sole ambition was to dedicate herself to the service of God. But her time in the convent was cut short due to her contracting an aggressive disease that killed her - she knew she would die but was consoled knowing she would be able to make her profession before she died.

Her canonization process opened on 23 April 1976 under Pope Paul VI and she became titled as a Servant of God. The confirmation of her life of heroic virtue on 22 March 1986 allowed for her to be titled as Venerable. Solar was beatified on 3 April 1987 in Chile after a miracle attributed to her from her native land cleared her for beatification while another miracle coming from Chile led Pope John Paul II to canonize her as a saint on 21 March 1993 in Saint Peter's Square.

Life
Juana Enriqueta Josefina de los Sagrados Corazones Fernández Solar was born in 1900 in Santiago in Chile to the upper class Miguel Fernández and Lucia Solar as the fourth of six children; three males and two females not including herself. Her brothers were Luis and Miguel and Ignacio and her sisters were Lucía and Rebeca (d. 31 December 1942). Rebeca became a Discalced Carmelite nun at the same convent as Juana as "Teresa of the Divine Heart". Her mother was Lucía Solar de Fernández, her father was Miguel Fernández Jara and her maternal grandfather was Eulogio Solar. Her baptism was celebrated in the parish church of Santa Ana.

Fernández Solar received her education in a college managed by French nuns from the Sacred Heart order, and she remained there from 1907 until 1918. In 1914, she decided to consecrate herself to the Lord and become a Discalced Carmelite. On 8 December 1915, she made a vow to remain chaste and she renewed it on a regular basis. Fernández Solar was pious in character, but could also be stubborn and vain; she also lost her temper on some occasions. On one particular occasion, her sister Rebeca grew so fed up with Juana that she hit her while the red-faced Juana grabbed her with anger but stopped and kissed her cheek. Rebeca was confused and unsure but chased her off and said: "Get out of here! You have given me the kiss of Judas!" Juana was hospitalized in 1913 for acute appendicitis. In her childhood, she also liked singing and dancing and played croquet and tennis. She was an able swimmer and could play the piano and harmonium. In 1916, she made a retreat for the Spiritual Exercises.

In her childhood, she read the autobiographical account that Thérèse of Lisieux had written and the experience had a profound effect on her pious and innocent character while also coming to the realization that she wanted to live for God alone. Fernández Solar had to work to overcome her initial self-centered character towards that of one directed to the caring of others above all. Her further inspiration for this self-transformation was her upcoming First Communion which led her to this commitment in an effort to achieve worthiness of what she was soon to receive. Fernández Solar received her Confirmation on 22 October 1909 and made her First Communion later on 11 September 1910. In September 1917 she sent a letter to the prioress of the Discalced Carmelite convent close to her home expressing her desire to enter the order. On October 18, 1917 a nun distributed candies to the children but she grew frustrated when she was given a small piece so hurled it out of her hand and refused another piece that the nun offered her. In late 1917 she and her mother left church and she turned to her mother in abruptness and asked whether she knew she would become a religious to which her mother told her that decision was for her father to make. Solar did not pursue it until from school she sent a letter to her father on 25 March 1919 that received no response; she returned home for a brief period but did not mention it and her father never alluded to it either but before she left for school again he consented when she asked him about it.

On 7 May 1919 she entered the novitiate of the Discalced Carmelites in Los Andes at which time she was given the new religious name of "Teresa of Jesus"; she later received the habit on the following 14 October. Toward the end of her short life the new nun began an apostolate of letter-writing in which she shared her thoughts on the spiritual life with others. But she soon contracted typhus that was diagnosed as fatal. However, some historians have suggested that she might have contracted Spanish flu, which was devastating Chile at this time. In any case, her condition grew worse on 2 April 1920 - Good Friday. Sister Teresa was still three months short of turning 20 and had six months to complete her canonical novitiate so as to make her religious vows. But she nevertheless was allowed to profess her vows "in articulo mortis" ("facing death") on 7 April 1920. Sister Teresa received the final sacraments on 5 April 1920 and later died at 7:15pm on 12 April 1920, one week after Easter. Her remains were later relocated in 1940 to a new chapel.

Sainthood

Teresa of Jesus remains popular with the estimated 100 000 pilgrims who visit on an annual basis the shrine where her remains are venerated in the Shrine of Saint Teresa of Los Andes in Los Andes. The nun is Chile's first saint and is popular more so among women and adolescents. Teresa of Jesus was the first Discalced Carmelite outside of Europe to be proclaimed as a saint and is the fifth saint of the order with the name "Teresa".

The beatification process began in an informative process in the Diocese of San Felipe from 20 March 1947 until its closure a few decades later on 14 January 1972; Bishop Roberto Bernardino Berríos Gaínza inaugurated this process while Enrique Alvear Urrutia oversaw its closure in a solemn Mass. Theologians collected her writings for assessment and approved them as being in line with the faith on 7 March 1975. The formal introduction to the cause came on 23 April 1976 under Pope Paul VI and she henceforth became titled as a Servant of God. There was a cognitional process that was also opened in San Felipe and it spanned from 17 November 1976 until 18 March 1978 while the Congregation for the Causes of Saints validated the two previous processes in Rome on 20 March 1981. The postulation later submitted the Positio to the C.C.S. in 1985 at which point theologians approved the cause on 3 December 1985 as did the cardinal and bishop members of the CCS on 18 March 1986. The confirmation of her model life of heroic virtue on 22 March 1986 allowed for Pope John Paul II to title her as Venerable after the C.C.S. Prefect Cardinal Pietro Palazzini bought the document to the pope for promulgation.

The process for a miracle attributed to her opened in Chile where the healing originated in and it was subjected to a diocesan process for investigation from 19 October 1984 until 16 October 1985 while the C.C.S. later validated it on 23 May 1986. The board of medical experts approved this healing to be miraculous on 21 January 1987 while theologians did so as well on 20 February 1987 as did the C.C.S. on 3 March 1987. John Paul II approved this healing to be a legitimate miracle on 16 March 1987 and thus confirmed her beatification. John Paul II beatified the late nun on 3 April 1987 in O'Higgins Park in Chile while her brother Luis was present at her beatification; he was the last direct relative of hers still alive then.

The process for a miracle attributed to her - the definitive one for sainthood - was investigated from 4 December 1990 to 12 June 1991 again in Chile while it received validation not long after on 18 October 1991. Medical experts this healing on 2 June 1992 as did theologians on 19 June 1992 and the C.C.S. on 7 July 1992. John Paul II confirmed the healing as a miracle on 11 June 1992 while he later canonized her on 21 March 1993 in Saint Peter's Square.

In popular media
Her life was used for the a Chilean television miniseries spanning from 6 August until 10 September 1989 starring Paulina Urrutia as Teresa of Jesus. Other films have been made about her life.

She was also mentioned in the Young Pope,  a 2016 religious drama TV miniseries.

See also
 Constitutions of the Carmelite Order

References

External links
 Hagiography Circle
 Saints SQPN
 Santi e Beati
 Help Fellowship
 
 Discalced Carmelites of the Australia-Oceania Region
 Holy See

1900 births
1920 deaths
20th-century venerated Christians
20th-century Christian saints
20th-century Chilean people
20th-century Christian mystics
Beatifications by Pope John Paul II
Burials in Chile
Canonizations by Pope John Paul II
Carmelite saints
Christian female saints of the Late Modern era
Chilean Roman Catholic religious sisters and nuns
Chilean Roman Catholic saints
Deaths from typhus
Discalced Carmelite nuns
People from Santiago
Venerated Carmelites
Venerated Catholics by Pope John Paul II
Carmelite mystics